WRHR-LP (95.3 FM) is a radio station licensed to Corbin, Kentucky, United States.  The station is currently owned by Corbin Independent School District.

References

External links
 

RHR-LP
RHR-LP
Corbin, Kentucky
Education in Knox County, Kentucky
Education in Whitley County, Kentucky